The 2002 season of the Tuvalu A-Division was the second season of association football competition. FC Niutao won the championship, their second consecutive title.

References

Tuvalu A-Division seasons
Tuvalu
football